Oleh Ostapenko may refer to:

 Oleh Ostapenko (footballer) (born 1997), Ukrainian footballer
 Oleh Ostapenko (manager) (born 1977), Ukrainian retired footballer and current manager